The 2018 Liga 3 Southeast Sulawesi is the first edition of Liga 3 (formerly known as Liga Nusantara) Southeast Sulawesi as a qualifying round for the national round of 2018 Liga 3. The competition will begin on 22 April 2018.

Format
In this competition, 16 teams are divided into 4 groups of four. The two best teams are through to knockout stage. The winner will represent Southeast Sulawesi in the national round of 2018 Liga 3.

Teams
There are 16 clubs which will participate the league in this season.

Group stage
This stage started on 22 April 2018. All matches held in Lakidende Stadium, Kendari

Group A

Group B

Group C

Group D

Knockout stage
All matches held in Lakidende Stadium, Kendari

References

2018 in Indonesian football
Southeast Sulawesi